Dame Anne Laura Dorinthea McLaren,  (26 April 1927 – 7 July 2007) was a British scientist who was a leading figure in developmental biology. Her work helped lead to human in vitro fertilisation (IVF), and she received many honours for her contributions to science, including election as fellow of the Royal Society.

Early life
McLaren was the daughter of Sir Henry McLaren, 2nd Baron Aberconway, a former Liberal MP, and Christabel Mary Melville MacNaghten. She was born in London and lived there until the outbreak of World War II, when her family moved to their estate at Bodnant, North Wales. As a child she appeared in the film version of H.G. Wells' novel Things to Come, released in 1936. She was entitled to be referred to as "The Honourable Anne McLaren".

She read zoology at Lady Margaret Hall, Oxford, later gaining an MA. Researching mite infestation of Drosophila under J.B.S. Haldane, she continued her post-graduate studies at University College London from 1949, first under Peter Medawar on the genetics of rabbits and then on neurotropic murine viruses under Kingsley Sanders. She obtained her DPhil in 1952 and married fellow student Dr Donald Michie on 6 October 1952.

Early career and married life
As a couple, McLaren and Donald Michie worked together at University College London from 1952 to 1955, and afterwards at the Royal Veterinary College, on the variation in the number of lumbar vertebrae in mice as a function of maternal environment. McLaren would later take up research on fertility in mice, including superovulation and superpregnancy. In 1958, she published a landmark Nature paper with John D. Biggers reporting the first successful development and birth of mice embryos that were first recovered from naturally fertilized females at the 8–16 cells stage, then cultured in vitro for two days until the blastocyst stage, and finally transferred back to females' uterus until birth. This paper entitled "Successful Development and Birth of Mice cultivated in vitro as Early Embryos" has been called "one of the most significant papers in the history of reproductive biology and medicine".

During this period, she also had three children:

 Susan Michie (born 19 June 1955)
 Jonathan Michie (born 25 March 1957)
 Caroline Michie (born in 1959)

However, the marriage ended in divorce in 1959, and McLaren moved to the Institute of Animal Genetics at University of Edinburgh to continue her research. The couple remained on good terms; Michie also moved to Edinburgh. The experience of raising children as a single career parent made McLaren a strong advocate for government assistance towards childcare.

Later career
McLaren spent the next 15 years (1959–1974) at the Institute of Animal Genetics, studying a variety of topics related to fertility, development and epigenetics, including the development of mouse embryonic transfer, immunocontraception, and the skeletal characteristics of chimerae.

In 1974, she left Edinburgh to become the Director of the MRC Mammalian Development Unit in London. In 1992, she retired from the Unit and moved to Cambridge, joining the Wellcome/CRC Institute, later the Gurdon Institute. She was made a Fellow-Commoner of Christ's College, Cambridge in 1991.

McLaren's work often took her outside the university. She was a member of the committee established to inquire into the technologies of in vitro fertilisation (IVF) and embryology, which later produced the Warnock Report. She was a member of the Nuffield Council on Bioethics, 1991–2000.

In 2004, McLaren was one of the co-founders of the Frozen Ark project, along with husband and wife Bryan and Ann Clarke. The project's aim is "Saving the DNA and viable cells of the world's endangered species".

In her later life, she was a member of the Communist Party of Great Britain, which made travel to the USA difficult for a while.

Honours
In 1975, McLaren was made a Fellow of the Royal Society. From 1991 to 1996, she held the position of Foreign Secretary of the Royal Society and from 1992 to 1996 the position of Vice-President; she was the first female officer in the society's 330-year history. In 1986, she was made a Fellow of the Royal College of Obstetricians and Gynaecologists for her pioneering work on fertility.  In 1989 she presented the Ellison-Cliffe Lecture at the Royal Society of Medicine, and from 1990 to 1995 she was the Fullerian Professor of Physiology at the Royal Institution.

In 1993, she was created a DBE. From 1993 to 1994, she was president of the British Association for the Advancement of Science, and in 1998 she was made a Fellow of the Academy of Medical Sciences.

In 2002, she was awarded the Japan Prize with Andrzej K. Tarkowski for their contributions to developmental biology, and in 2007 she was awarded the March of Dimes Prize in Developmental Biology.

Death
McLaren (aged 80) and Michie (aged 83) were killed on 7 July 2007, when their car left the M11 motorway as they travelled from Cambridge to London.

Legacy 
The Anne McLaren Papers are housed at the British Library and can be accessed through the British Library catalogue.

There is a fund in the name of Anne McLaren for encouragement of scientific study. Cambridge University's Anne McLaren Laboratory for Regenerative Medicine was opened at the Cambridge Biomedical Campus in 2009.

On 26 April 2021, Google celebrated her 94th birthday with a Google Doodle.

Obituaries

See also
 Beatrice Mintz, a contemporary of Dame Anne McLaren

References

External links

Research group homepage
Biographical interview
Tribute from her students

1927 births
2007 deaths
20th-century British women scientists
20th-century British zoologists
20th-century British biologists
21st-century British biologists
21st-century British women scientists
Academics of University College London
Academics of the University of Edinburgh
Alumni of Lady Margaret Hall, Oxford
Alumni of University College London
British women biologists
Communist Party of Great Britain members
Dames Commander of the Order of the British Empire
Daughters of barons
English biologists
English zoologists
Fellows of Christ's College, Cambridge
Fellows of King's College, Cambridge
Fellows of the Royal Society
Female Fellows of the Royal Society
Fullerian Professors of Physiology
L'Oréal-UNESCO Awards for Women in Science laureates
Anne
Michie family
National Institute for Medical Research faculty
Presidents of the British Science Association
Road incident deaths in England
Royal Medal winners
Scientists from London
Women zoologists